Vejen with a population of 10,009 (1 January 2022) is the main town in Vejen Municipality, Denmark.

Geography
The town is situated in the Danish region of Syddanmark and is a railway town at the railway between the cities of Kolding and Esbjerg.

Attractions
The Vejen Art Museum specializes in works from the end of the 19th century in styles including Symbolism and Art Nouveau.

Economy
The food industry is a major employer. Major companies include Eurofins Steins Laboratorium, with 425 employees (2015), Danish Crown and Aquapris, a manufacturer of fish products.

Notable people 

 Niels Hansen Jacobsen (1861 in Vejen – 1941) a Danish sculptor and ceramist
 Peter Petersen (1892 in Vejen – 1964) a sports shooter, competed at the 1920 and 1924 Summer Olympics
 Arne Petersen (1913 in Vejen – 1990) a cyclist, competed in the 1936 Summer Olympics
 Ingrid Vang Nyman (1916 in Vejen – 1959) a Danish illustrator of the Pippi Longstocking books
 Andrea Elisabeth Rudolph (born 1976 in Vejen) a Danish TV and radio host

References

External links

Municipal seats of the Region of Southern Denmark
Municipal seats of Denmark
Cities and towns in the Region of Southern Denmark
Vejen Municipality